Carlos Sánchez Barrios (born 17 August 1957) is a Mexican politician affiliated with the National Regeneration Movement. He currently represents Guerrero in the Chamber of Deputies for the LXIV Legislature of the Mexican Congress. He also was a federal deputy in the LX Legislature.

References

1957 births
Living people
Politicians from Guerrero
Members of the Chamber of Deputies (Mexico) for Guerrero
Party of the Democratic Revolution politicians
21st-century Mexican politicians
Morena (political party) politicians
Autonomous University of Guerrero alumni
Members of the Congress of Guerrero
Deputies of the LX Legislature of Mexico
Deputies of the LXIV Legislature of Mexico
Deputies of the LXV Legislature of Mexico